, also known as Ise no Tayū or Ise no Ōsuke, was a Japanese poet active in the early 11th century. 

She is one of the later Thirty-six Poetry Immortals, and one of her poems is included in the Ogura Hyakunin Isshu. Her contemporaries include Uma no Naishi, Murasaki Shikibu, and Sei Shōnagon. A diptych of her exists in Nihon Meijo Banashi (Stories of Famous Japanese Women), implying that although little of her work exists into modernity, she was considered a critically important figurehead of the waka poetry movement, both as a Poetry Immortal and as a woman of renown.

Her grandfather Ōnakatomi no Yoshinobu was also an important waka poet. 

Her mother, Kura no Myobu, served Fujiwara no Yorimichi, the first son of the powerful Michinaga, so she could get a support and joined to the imperial court. She became friends with Murasaki Shikibu and Izumi Shikibu. She was talented in music, so she was very popular and noble lady-in-waiting who moreover, could write poems and songs.

Poetry 
Only a few of no Taifu's poems have survived into modernity, translated in part due to Waka poetry anthologies:

One of her poems was included in the Ogura Hyakunin Isshu:

Below is another of her poems, translated in the Asia-Pacific Journal:

References

Women of medieval Japan
11th-century Japanese women writers
11th-century writers
Japanese women poets
11th-century Japanese poets
Hyakunin Isshu poets
11th-century Japanese people